Jeremy Corbett (born 1962 in Westport, New Zealand) is a radio and television host and comedian from New Zealand.

Corbett is the former breakfast co-host for More FM's Auckland broadcast, a position he held since 1993, finishing in November 2011. On television he appeared in Pulp Comedy and hosted the New Zealand edition of Deal or No Deal. He currently hosts the comedy game show 7 Days, and appears on The Project on TV3. He is a well-known New Zealand comedian and has appeared at numerous comedy festivals.

In 2012, he appeared in the Wellington-based New Zealand comedy, "Edwin: My Life as a Koont" which received international acclaim.

In October 2018 he was presented with the Reilly Comedy Award from the Variety Artists Club of New Zealand.

References

Living people
New Zealand comedians
People from Westport, New Zealand
New Zealand radio presenters
1959 births